Our Own Oddities is an illustrated panel that ran in the Sunday comics section of the St. Louis Post-Dispatch from September 1, 1940 to February 24, 1991. The feature displayed curiosities submitted by local readers and is often remembered for its drawings of freakish produce, such as a potato that resembled Richard Nixon. The style of the panel was very similar to Ripley's Believe it or Not!.

Publication history 
When it began September 1, 1940, it was titled St. Louis Oddities. The title changed in the late 1940s.

Graczak retired from the newspaper in 1980, but he continued to produce the panel for ten more years in addition to doing a talk show on St. Louis's KMOX radio. He died of a heart attack August 3, 1997.

Content 
The curiosities, including actual fruits and vegetables, were submitted to Post-Dispatch illustrator Ralph Graczak (pronounced Gray-zak), who each week selected several items and produced a color illustration to be printed in the Sunday paper. 

In addition to bizarre produce, Our Own Oddities featured other peculiar local trivia, such as a local woman who lived at 1919 Montgomery Street and was born at nine o'clock on August 19, 1919. Clever church signs and tombstone epitaphs were popular features.

Anniversary special
In September 2003, the Post-Dispatch accepted submissions for a 63rd anniversary special of Our Own Oddities. The best submissions, including a duck-shaped cucumber and a woman born on December 7, 1941, with the initials W.A.R., were illustrated by Post-Dispatch artist Dan Martin and featured in the October 6, 2003, edition.

Controversy
Despite its quaint illustrated style and typically benign subjects, the feature was the cause of controversy when on May 24, 1988, it included a sign on a truck-repair shop that read "These premises protected by a pit bull with AIDS." The newspaper printed several angry letters. Graczak and the newspaper's features editor expressed regret.

References

External links
Gallery: Our Own Oddities
History of Our Own Oddities
"Our Own Oddities, the book" St. Louis Post-Dispatch (May 14, 2009)

American comic strips
1940 comics debuts
1990 comics endings
St. Louis Post-Dispatch
Non-fiction comic strips